Tegernbach is a district of the municipality of Mittelstetten in the Upper Bavarian district of Fürstenfeldbruck in Germany. The church village is located about two kilometers northwest of Mittelstetten.

History
Duke Welf VI gave 1147 to his foundation of the Steingaden Abbey among other things also courts in Tegernbach. In 1331 a Burgstall is mentioned in the village, which was owned by the Fürstenfeld Abbey.

References

External links
 

Fürstenfeldbruck (district)